Mohammad Ali Al-Tantawi was a Syrian Salafi jurist, writer, editor, broadcaster, teacher and judge considered one of the leading figures in Islamic preaching and Arab literature in the twentieth century. On his mother side, he is the nephew of eminent pro-British Salafi journalist Muhib Al Din Al Khatib.

He was a writer who wrote in many Arab newspapers for many years, the most important of which was what he wrote in the Egyptian magazine Arrissalah by its owner Ahmed Hassan Al Zayyat, and he continued to write about it for twenty years from 1933 until it became concealed in 1953. 

He worked from his youth in primary and secondary education in Syria, Iraq and Lebanon until a year 1940. He left education and entered the judiciary. 

He was recipient of the King Faisal Prize in 1990 for his services for Islam.

Biography
He was born in Damascus in 1909, into a family of religious scholars: his paternal grandfather, who moved from Egypt, was a graduate of Al-Azhar who specialized in astronomy, his father was an Islamic scholar as well and so was his maternal uncle, Sheikh Muhibb-ud-Deen Al-Khatib. 

Educated at the prestigious Maktab Anbar, he’d then study Islamic law at the University of Damascus, and would militate against the French occupation of Syria, because of which he’ll resume his activities as teacher in Iraq, and later the Zionist project in Palestine, one of the first Islamic scholars putting his attention to this issue. 

Being unable to resume his Islamic activism as he wished, he moved to Saudi Arabia in the late 1960s where he spent the last decades of his life. He died in 1999 and was buried in Jeddah.

Books
 General introduction to Islam, Dar al-Manara, 2000 (third revised edition), 255 p.

References

1999 deaths
1909 births
Sunni Muslims
Muslim reformers
Syrian Muslims
Syrian Salafis
Syrian writers
Arab scientists
Syrian Sunni Muslim scholars of Islam
Syrian people of Egyptian descent
Naturalised citizens of Saudi Arabia
Syrian jurists
Multiple citizenship
Muslim Brotherhood of Syria politicians